Forza Europa was a centre-right political group with seats in the European Parliament between 1994 and 1995.

History
27 MEPs from the Italian centre-right party Forza Italia, along with MEPs of the Christian Democratic Centre and the Union of the Centre, were elected in the 1994 European election and formed their own Group, self-referentially called "Forza Europa", on 19 July 1994.  The group was unique at the time for being dominated one national-level political party, and being composed of MEPs from a single EU member nation. The group was generally sceptical of European integration.

The group was joined on 15 December 1994 by one MEP of the Italian Democratic Socialist Party, and one MEP of the Federalists and Liberal Democrats.

The Group lasted until it merged with the European Democratic Alliance to form the "Group Union for Europe" on 6 July 1995.

Sources
Democracy in the European Parliament
Europe Politique
European Parliament MEP Archives
Development of Political Groups in the European Parliament
European Parliament 1996 press releases
European Parliament election website 1999

References

Former European Parliament party groups

sv:Forza Europa